Marlon Alexander Stöckinger (born April 4, 1991) is a Filipino former racing driver, who raced for Status Grand Prix in the 2012 GP3 Series.   He is the first Filipino to win a formula race in Europe.

Stöckinger was the 2006 Asian Karting Champion, 2007 Philippine Rotax Max Champion and the 2008 Formula BMW Pacific Scholarship Winner.

Early life
Stöckinger was born in Manila, Philippines. He is the son of a Swiss businessman and racing enthusiast, Tom Stöckinger, and Filipina Egin San Pedro; He grew up in the Philippines until he was 17 and then went to Europe to pursue a racing career. In 2013, he was also host for Top Gear Philippines, along with Richard Gomez (Seasons 1–3), Gary Valenciano (Season 1 only), Apl.de.ap (Season 2 onwards) and Jolina Magdangal (Season 4 onwards).

Racing career

Early career
Prior to joining the Formula Renault series, Stöckinger won titles and honors from international derbies such as the Formula BMW Pacific 2008 Championships, the Senior Rotax Max World Finals 2007, the Asian Karting Championship 2006, the Junior Rotax Max-World Finals 2005 and the Philippine Shell Super Karting Series 2002. He participated at the 2008 Formula BMW Europe season -  the championship's maiden season after the merger of the British and German series — as a guest driver, racing at the Hungaroring (21st and 23rd place), Valencia Street Circuit (15th and 23rd place) and at the Circuit de Spa-Francorchamps (20th and 21st).

Formula Renault 2.0 UK (2009–2010)

Stöckinger made his debut at the UK championship in 2009 at 18 years of age, joining other newcomers including Harry Tincknell, Matias Laine and Will Stevens. He arrived 20th on his debut at Brands Hatch and eventually finished 25th in the championship with 56 points. His best result was an eleventh place at round eight at Oulton Park.

The following season began at Thruxton on 3 April 2010 and will end on 10 October at Brands Hatch, after twenty rounds held in England, and for the first time since 2006, Scotland. After arriving 10th in his first race of the year, the Filipino-Swiss driver was able to finish third at Rockingham Motor Speedway, his best result ever in two seasons. At the Croft Circuit (round 8) he started from pole and finished the race first, becoming the first Filipino to have won a formula race in Europe. The performance was then followed by a second place in the same circuit, behind Lewis Williamson.

FIA GP3 Series (2011–2012)
The following year, Stöckinger moved to the GP3 series, where he suited up for Atech CRS Grand Prix in the 2011 GP3 Series season.

Going into his second year in the GP3 Series, the Filipino was assessed by Status Grand Prix during their autumn tests. Stöckinger was regularly featured in the Top 5 of the time sheets at Barcelona, Valencia and Jerez tests, and impressed the team with his performances. In February 2012, Stöckinger left Atech GP and signed to join Status Grand Prix for the 2012 GP3 Series season. Stöckinger collected his first win in the 2012 GP3 Series at Monaco and set his first pole position and the fastest lap of the race.

Formula Renault 3.5 Series (2013-2015)

He became a member of the Lotus F1 Team in February 2013, serving as one of seven junior team drivers. Stöckinger and the other six young drivers will be supported by Lotus in all areas such as driving skills, physical fitness, health and nutrition, social and mental development, business ethics and principals, as well as PR training as a preparation for their future careers.

It was confirmed that Stöckinger will stay and drive for Lotus F1 on 2014 Formula Renault 3.5 season alongside newly recruited Matthieu Vaxivière of France and former French F4 Champion.

FIA GP2 Series (2015)
On 5 March 2015, it was confirmed Stöckinger would reunite with Status as one of their drivers in the 2015 GP2 season. He would go on to score no points and finished 26th in the series standings with a best finish of 11th.

Racing record

Career summary

† Guest driver ineligible to score points

Complete GP3 Series results
(key) (Races in bold indicate pole position) (Races in italics indicate fastest lap)

Complete Formula Renault 3.5 Series results
(key) (Races in bold indicate pole position) (Races in italics indicate fastest lap)

Complete GP2 Series results
(key) (Races in bold indicate pole position) (Races in italics indicate fastest lap)

Complete Blancpain GT Series Sprint Cup results

Personal life
, Stöckinger has been romantically involved with Miss Universe 2015 Pia Wurtzbach, and it was broke in 2019. Stöckinger is a practising Catholic. He has twin daughters with model Kit Barraquias.

References

External links
 Marlon Stöckinger's personal website
 
 

Filipino racing drivers
Sportspeople from Manila
1991 births
Living people
Filipino people of Swiss descent
GP3 Series drivers
World Series Formula V8 3.5 drivers
British Formula Renault 2.0 drivers
Formula Renault Eurocup drivers
GP2 Series drivers
Filipino Roman Catholics
Portuguese Formula Renault 2.0 drivers
Formula BMW Europe drivers
Formula BMW Pacific drivers
Blancpain Endurance Series drivers
CRS Racing drivers
EuroInternational drivers
Eurasia Motorsport drivers
Status Grand Prix drivers
Charouz Racing System drivers
ISR Racing drivers